Coiled-coil domain-containing protein 181 (CCDC181) is a protein that in human is encoded by C1orf114, which is located at the Chromosome 1 at 1q24.2. The accession is Q5T1D7. Researches have recently revealed that CCDC 181 is a microtubule-binding protein that interacts with murine Hook1 in haploid male germ cells and localizes to the sperm tail and motile cilia. The disruption of Hook1 may lead to inappropriate function of spermatogenesis. The dysfunction may be related to the abnormal head shape of sperm or distinctive structural changes in flagella in sperm, which can result in male infertility. An increased rate of my gene has found in the haploid phase of male cell during meiosis, thus it is believed to relate to sperm cell and aid in spermatogenesis.

Expression

It is discovered that a significant high expression of CCDC 181 found on human testis, which is a male reproductive gland. This is related to the study of its encoded protein-CCDC181, which relates to human infertility when in low expression. Also, high expression of protein is found in the olfactory area and cortical subplate. Researchers have studied the expression of CCDC 181 under different conditions. One of the outstanding findings is that under the coexistence of Rho GTP dissociation inhibitor, the expression of CCDC 181 is depressed. Rho GTP dissociation inhibitor has a phenomenal effect on bladder cancer cells, so studies have suggested that CCDC 181 might also be related to bladder cancer.

Homology

Orthologs have been found mainly in eukaryotes, including mammals, birds, reptiles, amphibians and fishes, with the highest identity on the mammalian species.

Genes on human chromosome 1